Indian Valley High School may refer to:

 Indian Valley High School (Ohio), Gnadenhutten, Ohio
 Indian Valley High School (Pennsylvania), Lewistown, Pennsylvania